Choreutis limonias is a species of moth of the family Choreutidae. It is found in Australia.

References

External links
Image at CSIRO Entomology

Choreutis
Moths of Australia
Moths described in 1907
Taxa named by Edward Meyrick